Hemileuca grotei, or Grote's buck moth, is a species of insect in the family Saturniidae. It is found in North America.

The MONA or Hodges number for Hemileuca grotei is 7733.

Subspecies
These two subspecies belong to the species Hemileuca grotei:
 Hemileuca grotei diana Packard, 1874
 Hemileuca grotei grotei Grote & Robinson, 1868

References

Further reading

 
 
 

Hemileucinae
Articles created by Qbugbot
Moths described in 1868